Garvin Thomas Snell, known professionally by his screen name Garvin Thomas is a television journalist currently with NBC Bay Area, KNTV, in the San Francisco Bay Area. He is a reporter, photographer, editor, and sometimes fill-in anchor. He is in charge of the Bay Area Proud  franchise, which "profiles the people, the groups, and the companies making the Bay Area, and the world, a better place to live." Prior to joining NBC Bay Area, Thomas had worked in Boston, Minneapolis, Los Angeles and overseas in Berlin, Germany.

Education
Garvin grew up in Yarmouth Port, Massachusetts, and graduated from Dennis-Yarmouth Regional High School in 1984. He then went on to pursue his degree at Boston College, where he majored in Germanic Studies and graduated with a Bachelor of Arts in 1988. He also attended the Universitat Konstanz in Konstanz, Germany for one year.

Professional career
His stories are produced under KNTV's Bay Area Proud  banner.

Since debuting the Bay Area Proud franchise in 2013, Garvin has produced more than 500 stories. Some highlights among those are stories about a woman with a terminal cancer diagnosis being given a dream wedding, a 12-year-old who created a low-cost Braille printer out of Lego, and an Oakland man using illegally dumped trash to create small homes for the homeless.

Thomas has experience throughout multiple aspects of television journalism. According to his bio, he "started out at NBC Bay Area as a general assignment reporter, but his responsibilities and skills have grown over the years." He is versatile as a writer, reporter, photographer, editor and fill-in anchor. He "also shoots and edits all his own stories."

Career History
Thomas has more than two decades of experience working in television news, and has worked in Boston (on two separate occasions), Berlin, Minneapolis and Los Angeles. He joined NBC Bay Area in 2004.

Previously, he worked with KABC Los Angeles for a short time in early 2004, WHDH in Boston for five years, and WCCO in Minneapolis, MN for five years.

He was also involved in Monitor Broadcasting in Berlin, Germany, where he was the Associate Producer for World Monitor.

Awards
Garvin has won multiple national, regional, and local awards for both his reporting and photography. Among these awards are the 2013 Sigma Delta Chi Award for feature reporting, a 1st and 2nd place in the 2015 National Press Photographers Association Best of Photojournalism competition, and eight regional Emmy awards.

He has won numerous other awards as well:
2020 Northern California Emmy Award: Video Journalist - No Time Limit
2019 Northern California Emmy Award: Writer
2019 Northern California Emmy Award: Video Journalist - No Time Limit
2018 Northern California Emmy Award: General Assignment Report 
2017 Edward R. Murrow Award, Region 2, Writing 
2016 Northern California Emmy Award: Writer 
2016 Northern California Emmy Award: Video Journalist - No Time Limit 
2016 National Press Photographers Association 2015 Best Of Photojournalism 1st place, Solo Video Journalist 
2016 Edward R. Murrow Award, Region 2, Writing 
2016 Gabriel Award - Short Feature
2015 Northern California Emmy Award: Video Journalist - No Time Limit 
2015 National Press Photographers Association 2015 Best Of Photojournalism 1st and 2nd place, Solo Video Journalist - Feature 
2015 Edward R. Murrow Award, Region 2 - Writing 
2014 Gabriel Award - Short Feature
2014 Northern California Emmy Award: Video Journalist - No Time Limit
2013 Society of Professional Journalists Sigma Delta Chi Award - Feature Reporting (Markets 1-50)
2013 Northern California Emmy Award: Feature News Report - Light Series
2013 Northern California Emmy Award: Video Journalist - No Time Limit
2010 San Francisco Bay Area Press Photographers Association: Best Sports Photography
2009 San Francisco Bay Area Press Photographers Association Award: Best Feature Photography
2007 Mark Twain Award: Reporter of the Year
2007 Mark Twain Award: Best Serious Feature
2005 Mark Twain Award (formerly APTRA): Best Light Feature
2004 Northern California Emmy Award: Best Serious Feature News Report
2004 Associated Press Television and Radio Association Award: Best Serious Feature
2000 New England Emmy Award: Outstanding Spot News
1999 New England Emmy Award: Outstanding Achievement - News Reporting
1997 Minnesota Associated Press Award: Best Sports Feature
1997 Peabody Award: WCCO Mentoring Team Station Project
1994 Alfred I. Dupont Award: WCCO Dimension Unit
1993 Chicago/Midwest Emmy Award: Best News Special

Personal life
In December 2002, Garvin and his wife, Karen, quit their jobs as news reporters at Boston area TV stations to spend a year travelling the world. The Cape Cod Times published a story about their trip prior to their departure, and detailed the preparations that went into the trip. Their website chronicling the journey says,
On December 1st, 2002 Garvin and Karen headed off on a once in a lifetime adventure.   We left our jobs, gave up our apartment, and put our stuff in storage in order to backpack around the world. One year, 6 continents, 17 countries, and countless miles later we returned to the United States.

Currently, Garvin and his wife live in the Santa Cruz Mountains with their three children.

References

External links
Garvin Thomas's Bio
Bay Area Proud 
Garvin and his wife's world travelling trip

Living people
American television journalists
People from the San Francisco Bay Area
American male journalists
Year of birth missing (living people)